Malcolm Russell Airs  (born March 1941) is emeritus professor of conservation and the historic environment at Kellogg College, University of Oxford and Emeritus Professor, Department of Education.

Airs was appointed Officer of the Order of the British Empire (OBE) in the 2019 Birthday Honours for services to the historic environment, conservation and education.

References

Living people
1941 births
Fellows of the Society of Antiquaries of London
Fellows of the Royal Historical Society
Fellows of Kellogg College, Oxford
Architectural historians
Officers of the Order of the British Empire